Igor Andreev and Nikolay Davydenko were the defending champions, but lost in the final this year.

Max Mirnyi and Mikhail Youzhny won the title, defeating Andreev and Davydenko 5–1, 5–1 in the final.

Seeds

Draw

External links
 2005 Kremlin Cup Men's Doubles Draw

Kremlin Cup
Kremlin Cup